Tain is one of the constituencies represented in the Parliament of Ghana. It was created in 2004. It elects one Member of Parliament (MP) by the first past the post system of election. Tain is located in the Bono Region of Ghana.

Boundaries 
The seat is located within the Tain District of the Bono Region of Ghana.

Members of Parliament

Elections

See also 
 List of Ghana Parliament constituencies
 List of political parties in Ghana

References 

Parliamentary constituencies in the Bono Region